Bellmore is a hamlet and census-designated place (CDP) in Nassau County, New York, United States. The population according to the 2010 census was 16,218.

Bellmore, along with North Bellmore, are referred to collectively as "The Bellmores". The part of the latter area south of Merrick Road (or possibly south of Sunrise Highway) is sometimes called "South Bellmore".

Bellmore serves as a suburb of New York City on Long Island. Penn Station in Manhattan is typically a 45-minute direct ride from the station on the Long Island Rail Road's Babylon Branch. John F. Kennedy Int'l Airport is located within  of Bellmore, making it convenient for travelers. Major thoroughfares that wind through the suburb include Sunrise Highway, Southern State Parkway, Merrick Road, Bellmore Avenue, Jerusalem Avenue, and Newbridge Road.

Geography
Bellmore is located at  (40.661188, −73.529005).

Demographics

As of the census of 2010, Bellmore has 16,218 people, 5,552 households, and 4,604 families residing in the CDP. The population density was 6,640.5 per square mile (2,559.6/km2). There were 5,807 housing units at an average density of 2,311.9/sq mi (891.1/km2). The racial makeup of the CDP was 93.4% White, 1% African American, 0.1% Native American, 3% Asian, 0.0% Pacific Islander, 1.8% from other races, and 1.3% from two or more races. Hispanic or Latino of any race were 5.7% of the population.

There were 5,552 households, out of which 36.3% had children under the age of 18 living with them, 74.3% were married couples living together, 2.9% had a female householder with no husband present, and 20.7% were non-families. 17.9% of all households were made up of individuals, and 10.4% had someone living alone who was 65 years of age or older. The average household size was 2.94 and the average family size was 3.39. Median value of owner-occupied housing units 2007-2011 was $486,000.

In the CDP, the population was spread out, with 24% under the age of 18, 5.9% from 18 to 24, 29.7% from 25 to 44, 25.8% from 45 to 64, and 14.3% who were 65 years of age or older. The median age was 41.6 years. For every 100 females, there were 95.7 males. For every 100 females age 18 and over, there were 92.1 males.

The median income for a household in the CDP was $108,589, and the median income for a family was $126,321. Males had a median income of $57,026 versus $33,743 for females. The per capita income for the CDP was $44,643. About .6% of families and 1.1% of the population were below the poverty line, including 0% of those under age 18 and 2% of those age 65 or over.

History
In 1643, Bellmore was a farming and fishing town known then as "Little Neck and "New Bridge". Bellmore was settled primarily by Englishmen who crossed Long Island Sound from Connecticut in the middle of the seventeenth century. Bradley Vogel purchased a  farm in what is now North Bellmore in 1655. Further south, near the bay, John Smith deeded  to his son, Jeremiah in 1676. John Bedell married Sarah Southard and moved into their new home on Merrick Road in about 1689. Two communities grew out of these beginnings. Smithville (later Smithville South) was named for the many Smith families who lived in the area, and New Bridge, named for the bridge that joined the peninsulas south of Merrick Road.

When the railroad was built through the area in 1867 they arbitrarily named their station Bellmore. Development followed as both communities grew towards the railroad and adopted the name Bellmore. By 1920, the Bellmores had a population of 3000 as well as stores along Bedford Avenue. The town was officially named Bellmore in 1900, when the post office was established.

The Bellmore Memorial Library, was founded in 1948. It was started in an old schoolhouse. This library has lasted since 1948 until present, keeping it as the main library of Bellmore, New York.

In 1968, the Supreme Court ruled against Sam's Stationery and Luncheonette of Bellmore. In Ginsberg v. New York, the Court found that it was well within the state's power to protect minors and that just because the material is not classified as obscene to adults it may still be regulated with minors.

Schools 
The city is home to the annual Mathematical Olympiads for Elementary and Middle Schools, a prestigious school math competition in the United States.

General
The school districts of Bellmore are the Bellmore School District, North Bellmore School District, and the Bellmore-Merrick Central High School District. The Bellmorites go to school for K-6 in their respective district (North Bellmore or Bellmore) and then go on to the Bellmore-Merrick Central High School District for grades 7-12. This is one of the four central districts of New York. For two years, North Bellmore and Bellmore students are combined in Grand Avenue. After, Bellmore students go to Kennedy, and North Bellmore students to Mepham. However, this may vary depending on zoning. The administrative offices for the Bellmore Public Schools are located in Winthrop Avenue, while the administrative offices for North Bellmore are in Martin Avenue. Brookside School, in North Merrick, is the home of the Bellmore-Merrick Central-High School District's offices, as well as the alternative school.

Education 
The North Bellmore students go to the schools that they are zoned for. However, Bellmore students in the same grade all go to the same school, as each grade level is in one of the three schools and not all. All Bellmore and North Bellmore Students go to Grand Avenue along with a few North Merrick Students who attended Park Avenue Elementary School, and then they split and go to their zoned school in the Central High School District. However, students not zoned for Calhoun may go to that school if they have a special interest in the arts. Students interested in attending Calhoun for the arts must audition.

Below are the schools, their grade levels and the town or towns that go to them.

An asterisk (*) means that the school is part of the Bellmore Merrick Central High School District. All other schools are in the district of town that attends them.

Notable people

Tatyana Ali, graduate of Saw Mill Road School and Harvard, briefly attended Grand Avenue Jr High School; actress and singer, notably in The Fresh Prince of Bel-Air
Tina Ann, singer
Justin Beck, guitarist for Glassjaw & Sons of Abraham, and founder of MerchDirect
Mark Belger, former American Middle Distance Runner record holder
Donny Brady, former NFL and CFL corner back
Lenny Bruce, comedian
Michael Dweck, artist/photographer
William Casey, former CIA director
Matt Gilroy, NHL player for the New York Rangers
George Kennedy, actor
Gene Larkin, former baseball player for the Minnesota Twins
Adam Lazzara, musician/lead singer of Taking Back Sunday; lived in Bellmore when he first moved to Long Island
Daryl Palumbo,  lead singer in the rock groups Glassjaw and Head Automatica
Kurt Ralske, artist and musician/composer
Laurence Traiger, composer
Fred Travalena, comedian
Amos Zereoué, former NFL running back
Adam Saleh, YouTube personality
Eric Chester, author, socialist political activist, and former economics professor
Scott Zakarin, film producer

References

Hempstead, New York
Census-designated places in New York (state)
Hamlets in New York (state)
Census-designated places in Nassau County, New York
Hamlets in Nassau County, New York
Populated coastal places in New York (state)